(born , ; 16 April 1844 – 12 October 1924) was a French poet, journalist, and novelist with several best-sellers. Ironic and skeptical, he was considered in his day the ideal French man of letters. He was a member of the Académie Française, and won the 1921 Nobel Prize in Literature "in recognition of his brilliant literary achievements, characterized as they are by a nobility of style, a profound human sympathy, grace, and a true Gallic temperament".

France is also widely believed to be the model for narrator Marcel's literary idol Bergotte in Marcel Proust's In Search of Lost Time.

Early years
The son of a bookseller, France, a bibliophile, spent most of his life around books. His father's bookstore specialized in books and papers on the French Revolution and was frequented by many writers and scholars. France studied at the Collège Stanislas, a private Catholic school, and after graduation he helped his father by working in his bookstore. After several years, he secured the position of cataloguer at Bacheline-Deflorenne and at Lemerre. In 1876, he was appointed librarian for the French Senate.

Literary career
France began his literary career as a poet and a journalist. In 1869, Le Parnasse contemporain published one of his poems, "". In 1875, he sat on the committee in charge of the third Parnasse contemporain compilation. As a journalist, from 1867, he wrote many articles and notices. He became known with the novel  (1881). Its protagonist, skeptical old scholar Sylvester Bonnard, embodied France's own personality. The novel was praised for its elegant prose and won him a prize from the Académie Française. 

He was elected to the Académie Française in 1896.

France took a part in the Dreyfus affair. He signed Émile Zola's manifesto supporting Alfred Dreyfus, a Jewish army officer who had been falsely convicted of espionage. France wrote about the affair in his 1901 novel Monsieur Bergeret.

France's later works include Penguin Island (1908) which satirizes human nature by depicting the transformation of penguins into humans – after the birds have been baptized by mistake by the almost-blind Abbot Mael. It is a satirical history of France, starting in Medieval times, going on to the author's own time with special attention to the Dreyfus affair and concluding with a dystopian future. The Gods Are Athirst (1912) is a novel, set in Paris during the French Revolution, about a true-believing follower of Maximilien Robespierre and his contribution to the bloody events of the Reign of Terror of 1793–94. It is a wake-up call against political and ideological fanaticism and explores various other philosophical approaches to the events of the time. The Revolt of the Angels (1914) is often considered France's most profound and ironic novel. Loosely based on the Christian understanding of the War in Heaven, it tells the story of Arcade, the guardian angel of Maurice d'Esparvieu. Bored because Bishop d'Esparvieu is sinless, Arcade begins reading the bishop's books on theology and becomes an atheist. He moves to Paris, meets a woman, falls in love, and loses his virginity causing his wings to fall off, joins the revolutionary movement of fallen angels, and meets the Devil, who realizes that if he overthrew God, he would become just like God. Arcade realizes that replacing God with another is meaningless unless "in ourselves and in ourselves alone we attack and destroy Ialdabaoth." "Ialdabaoth", according to France, is God's secret name and means "the child who wanders".

He was awarded the Nobel Prize in 1921. He died in 1924 and is buried in the Neuilly-sur-Seine Old Communal Cemetery near Paris.

On 31 May 1922, France's entire works were put on the Index Librorum Prohibitorum ("List of Prohibited Books") of the Catholic Church. He regarded this as a "distinction". This Index was abolished in 1966.

Personal life
In 1877, France married Valérie Guérin de Sauville, a granddaughter of Jean-Urbain Guérin, a miniaturist who painted Louis XVI. Their daughter Suzanne was born in 1881 (and died in 1918).

France's relations with women were always turbulent, and in 1888 he began a relationship with Madame Arman de Caillavet, who conducted a celebrated literary salon of the Third Republic. The affair lasted until shortly before her death in 1910.

After his divorce, in 1893, France had many liaisons, notably with a Madame Gagey, who committed suicide in 1911.

In 1920, France married for the second time, to Emma Laprévotte.

France was a socialist and an outspoken supporter of the 1917 Russian Revolution. In 1920, he gave his support to the newly founded French Communist Party. In his book The Red Lily, France famously wrote, "The law, in its majestic equality, forbids rich and poor alike to sleep under bridges, to beg in the streets, and to steal loaves of bread."

Reputation

The English writer George Orwell defended France and declared that his work remained very readable, and that "it is unquestionable that he was attacked partly from political motives".

Works

Poetry

 , poem published in 1867 in the Gazette rimée.
  (1873)
  (The Bride of Corinth) (1876)

Prose fiction
  (Jocasta and the Famished Cat) (1879)
  (The Crime of Sylvestre Bonnard) (1881)
  (The Aspirations of Jean Servien) (1882)
  (Honey-Bee) (1883)
  (1889)
  (1890)
  (Mother of Pearl) (1892)
  (At the Sign of the Reine Pédauque) (1892)
  (The Opinions of Jerome Coignard) (1893)
  (The Red Lily) (1894)
  (The Well of Saint Clare) (1895)
  (A Chronicle of Our Own Times)
 1:  (The Elm-Tree on the Mall)(1897)
 2:  (The Wicker-Work Woman) (1897)
 3:  (The Amethyst Ring) (1899)
 4:  (Monsieur Bergeret in Paris) (1901)
 Clio (1900)
  (A Mummer's Tale) (1903)
  (The White Stone) (1905)
  (1901)
  (Penguin Island) (1908)
  (The Merrie Tales of Jacques Tournebroche) (1908)
  (The Seven Wives of Bluebeard and Other Marvelous Tales) (1909)
 Bee The Princess of the Dwarfs (1912)
  (The Gods Are Athirst) (1912)
  (The Revolt of the Angels) (1914)
  (1920) illustrated by Fernand Siméon

Memoirs
  (My Friend's Book) (1885)
  (1899)
  (Little Pierre) (1918)
  (The Bloom of Life) (1922)

Plays
  (1898)
 Crainquebille (1903)
  (The Man Who Married A Dumb Wife) (1908)
  (The Wicker Woman) (1928)

Historical biography
  (The Life of Joan of Arc) (1908)

Literary criticism
 Alfred de Vigny (1869)
  (1888)
  (The Latin Genius) (1909)

Social criticism
  (The Garden of Epicurus) (1895)
  (1902)
  (1904)
  (1906)
  (1915)
 , in four volumes, (1949, 1953, 1964, 1973)

References

External links

 
 
 List of Works
 
 
 
  
 "Anatole France, Nobel Prize Winner" by Herbert S. Gorman, The New York Times'', 20 November 1921
 Correspondence with architect Jean-Paul Oury at Syracuse University
 
 Anatole France, his work in audio version   
 

1844 births
1924 deaths
Writers from Paris
French bibliophiles
Collège Stanislas de Paris alumni
French fantasy writers
French Nobel laureates
19th-century French poets
French satirists
Members of the Académie Française
Nobel laureates in Literature
Dreyfusards
19th-century French novelists
20th-century French novelists
French socialists
French male poets
French male novelists
19th-century male writers
French historical novelists
Burials at Neuilly-sur-Seine community cemetery
19th-century pseudonymous writers
20th-century pseudonymous writers
Christian novelists